A list of films produced by the Bollywood film industry based in Mumbai in 1934:

A

B-C

D-G

H-K

M-N

P-R

S

T-Z

References

External links
 Bollywood films of 1934 at the IMDb

1934
Bollywood
Films, Bollywood